"The lamb with the lion" – often a paraphrase from Isaiah, and more closely quoted as "the lion and lamb", "a child will lead them", and the like – are an artistic and symbolic device, most generally related to peace.

The symbol is used in both Christianity and Judaism to represent the Messianic Age. In addition, in Christianity, according to a sermon by Augustine, the lion stands for Christ resurrected, the lamb for Christ's sacrifice ("He endured death as a lamb; he devoured it as a lion."—Augustine, Sermon 375A).

Isaiah 35:9 casts a lion as metaphorically forbidden in the future paradise ("No lion shall be there, nor any ravenous beast shall go up thereon, it shall not be found there; but the redeemed shall walk there"); yet, Isaiah 65:25 and Isaiah 11:6–7, respectively reference such formerly ravenous beasts as becoming peaceable: "The wolf and the lamb shall feed together, the lion shall eat straw like the ox; but the serpent—its food shall be dust!"; "The wolf shall live with the lamb, the leopard shall lie down with the kid, the calf and the lion and the fatling together, and a little child shall lead them."

"In like a lion, out like a lamb" is a proverb having to do with March weather. It has been speculated that its origin is from astrological Leo (lion) being followed by Aries (ram).

Examples

In the 1830s, American Quaker artist Edward Hicks began painting a series of paintings on the theme of the Peaceable Kingdom.

The kingdom-of-peace motif has been popular among various so-called Christian "Restorationist" groups. The lamb and lion have been used informally in Community of Christ since the Latter Day Saints' "Kirtland" period. Its original formal iteration, prominently featuring the lion, the lamb, and child, along with the motto Peace, was designed by Joseph Smith III, Jason W. Briggs, and Elijah Banta, and approved in the denomination's General Conference in 1874. The Worldwide Church of God (now Grace Communion International) had used a seal depicting the lamb, the lion and a child.

A number of "peace" gardens or fountains at Jewish, Catholic, and Protestant places of worship contain statuary containing the lamb and lion. In 1987, the Lion & Lamb Peace Arts Center was established at Mennonite Bluffton University.

Humorist Josh Billings (1818–1885): "The lion and the lamb may possibly sometimes lie down together; but if you'll notice carefully, when the lion gets up, the lamb is generally missing." Attributed to Woody Allen: "I've always liked, someday the lamb will lay by the lion ... but it won't get much sleep."

Gallery

See also
 Peaceable Kingdom
 The Wolf and the Lamb
 Hosanna to God and the Lamb
 Snake handling
 Coat of arms of the London Borough of Barnet

Notes

Citations 

Peace symbols
Symbols of Abrahamic religions
Iconography
Heraldry
Lions in heraldry
Book of Isaiah